Na růžích ustláno is a 1935 Czechoslovak  film, directed by Miroslav Cikán. It stars  Antonie Nedošinská, Lída Baarová, and Marie Tauberová.

Cast
Antonie Nedošinská as Haugwitzová
Lída Baarová as Mariana
Marie Tauberová as Klárka
Jindřich Plachta as Haugwitz
Jirí Plachý as Garden
Ladislav Pešek as Kuropkin
Eduard Šlégl as Ladman
Jaroslav Marvan as Hubácek, reditel hotelu
Stanislav Neumann as Kominík
Darja Hajská as Gineta
Milada Smolíková as Osetrovatelka
Marie Kučerová as Kucharka
Ladislav Hemmer as Hejsek

References

External links
Na růžích ustláno at the Internet Movie Database

1935 films
Films directed by Miroslav Cikán
Czech comedy films
Czechoslovak black-and-white films
1930s Czech-language films
1930s Czech films